Stefano Pellegrini (5 August 1953 – 18 March 2018) was an Italian professional footballer who played as a striker.

Career
Pellegrini began playing football with Roma, where he made his Serie A debut against Lazio on 14 March 1971. He played for 6 seasons (53 games, 9 goals) in the Serie A for A.S. Roma and Avellino.

His older brother Romolo Pellegrini and younger brother Claudio Pellegrini also played football professionally. To distinguish them, Romolo was referred to as Pellegrini I, Stefano as Pellegrini II and Claudio as Pellegrini III.

His career ended with a 6-year ban in the Totonero 1980 match-fixing scandal.

References

1953 births
2018 deaths
Italian footballers
Serie A players
A.S. Roma players
U.S. Avellino 1912 players
S.S.C. Bari players
Association football forwards
Footballers from Rome